Jane Jackson Thompson (also Thomson) (–after 1792) was an enslaved person who lived with her common-law husband, Talbot Thompson, until he was able to purchase her freedom in 1769. Talbot was a successful sail-maker and provided a comfortable life for Jane and their family.

They became Black Loyalists during the American Revolutionary War after all of their property was burned down in 1776. Her children and their families also became loyalists and joined the British between 1775 and 1780. Although her children were with several inter-connected slave owners mostly from the Norfolk, Virginia area. In accordance with Lord Dunmore's proclamation of 1775, Jane and her family members were loyal to the British and attained or maintained their freedom under the British.

She came to Nova Scotia in 1783, when she was between 60 and 70 years of age. Her descendants lived in Birchtown and other towns in Nova Scotia. She was the matriarch of Nova Scotian Settlers who relocated to Sierra Leone in 1792.

Early and personal life
Jane Thompson, also known as Jenny, and her mother Sabina were slaves of John Tucker, who came with his brother to Virginia from the Caribbean about the turn of the 18th century. Her father may have been a man named "Old Joe" Tucker. In 1735, they were the only two women on Tucker's slave list. At that time, Jane was about 16 years of age, born about 1719. John Tucker died in 1737, and she was inherited by his nephew, Colonel Robert Tucker. Robert also inherited John's mercantile empire. Jane lived in Norfolk, Virginia as a slave. She was recorded on Tucker's tithable list in 1750 and called Old Jenny, worth five pounds in 1767.

Marriage and children
By 1737, when she was about 18 years of age, she already had several small children. Her children included: Betty and King Tucker; James, Edward, and John Jackson; and James and Samuel Thompson. They were in the records for Black Loyalists who moved to Nova Scotia.

She had several children with the Jackson surname who also went to Nova Scotia. She was married to Talbot Thompson, who bought his freedom in 1761 and earned his living making sails. They lived together for a number of years, even though she was a slave of Robert Tucker. After Robert Tucker's death, Talbot purchased her freedom at the sale of Tucker's estate, the manumission was formalized on June 14, 1769. Tucker's son said that she provided "fidelity, extraordinary Services, and constant Obedience" to the Tuckers. Talbot Thompson was on the same tithables list as Robert Tucker. She may have had two or more children with Talbot, such as Samuel Thompson and James Thompson.

Talbot Thompson was a successful sail-maker in Norfolk, and had a number of staff and apprentices. Jane and her husband bought a large property that included a main two-story house, other smaller houses, a garden and orchards just before Christmas in 1770. It had a dairy, piggery, and stables. They became interested in Methodism, likely inspired in 1772 by traveling preachers Joseph Pilmore or Robert Williams. They participated in racially-diverse religious meetings in houses of people in the maritime businesses. One of the attendees was his client, Andrew Sprowle, who controlled business for the Royal Navy.

American Revolutionary War
During the American Revolutionary War, son James Jackson, identified as a former slave of Robert Tucker, was recruited by Lord Dunmore, governor of the Colony of Virginia about 1775 to be a pilot for the Royal Navy. He was under Captain Henry Mowat and served on the ship London. Lord Dunmore issued a proclamation on November 14, 1775, that all blacks—whether slaves, free or indentured—would be freed if they served the British during the war.

Talbot and Jane defected to Lord Dunbar by January 1776 when a fire in Norfolk resulted in the destruction of all of Talbot's property. Talbot ran away in December 1775, after Norfolk was destroyed, and joined the British. Jane joined Lord Dunmore in January 1776. Dunmore seized Tucker's Point in February and occupied the land and the mill there until May 1776, during which time Grace Thompson, Jane's daughter-in-law and Samuel Thompson's wife, was with Jane and Talbot Thompson at Tucker's Point. Grace embarked on the Dunluce on May 21, 1776, but at some point returned to Norfolk and ran away again with two girls in 1779.

James Jackson's adult son, London Jackson, who had been a slave to William Ballad of Hampton, joined the British under Mowatt in late 1780. James and London Jackson were awarded land on Nutt Island (perhaps McNutts Island) for their service. Son John Jackson, served the British General Leslie in Hampton in late 1780. He was a slave of Anthony Walke, who was an associate of Robert Tucker.

Talbot died in 1782 in New York. Jane filed a claim to the Loyalist Claims Commission for the destruction of their property in Norfolk in January 1776. Her nine-page claim was rejected by the British.

Nova Scotia
A Black Loyalist, Jane traveled to Nova Scotia on the L'Abondance and was described as being worn out, about 70 years of age, and formerly the property of Thomas Newton of Norfolk. She travelled with her five-year-old grandchild. She travelled with Hannah Jackson, her daughter-in-law, and Robert and Peter Jackson, her grandchildren. They lived together in Birchtown. Son John and his wife Nancy sailed on the same ship to Nova Scotia as Jane. In the Birchtown Muster of 1784, John was 41 (born about 1743) and Nancy was 32. Betty Tucker, listed on the Birchtown Muster next to Jane's name, may have been Jane's daughter. Grace Thompson, a widow, and her two daughters are likely the daughter-in-law and granddaughters of Jane. They were slaves of Edward Thruston, Robert Tucker's uncle. She traveled on the same ship as James Thompson, who was owned by Edward Cooper of Hampton, and is believed to be Jane's son. Grace and James lived near each other in Birchtown.

In 1791, most of her family members relocated to Sierra Leone. She remained in Nova Scotia, where in 1792 she was listed as destitute.

Family information

Notes

References

1710s births
American freedmen
African Americans in the American Revolution
Black Loyalists
Black Nova Scotians
18th-century American slaves
18th-century African-American women